Agir or AGIR may refer to:
 Agir (singer), Portuguese singer
 AGIR (student organization), Galician independence group
 Agir (Belgium), Belgian political party
 Agir (France), French political party
 Agir ensemble, French parliamentary group
 Réseau AGIR, French World War II espionage group
 SMS Ägir, Imperial German ship
 Aqel, also known as Agir, a village in East Azerbaijan Province, Iran
 David Agir, Nauruan politician

See also
 Ægir (disambiguation)
 Agar (disambiguation)
 Ager (disambiguation)